The 1926 Chatham Cup was the fourth annual nationwide knockout football competition in New Zealand.

The competition was run on a regional basis, with five regional associations (Auckland, Wellington, Waikato, Canterbury, and Otago) each holding separate qualifying rounds. In all, 36 teams entered the 1926 competition, with the overwhelming majority being from the North Island.

In the South Auckland District there were four entries from Pukemiro, Huntly, Huntly Thistle and Frankton Railways. According to Huntly Thistle's club website, the club beat Pukemiro 6-0 and Hikurangi 4-0 before losing to the eventual finalists North Shore 3-1. 

In the Manawatu District there were four entries. St. Andrew's, Palmerston North R.S.A, Palmerston North Athletic and Rangers.

One unusual feature of the 1926 competition was that three of the four semi-finalist sides were composed largely of staff from three of the country's largest mental hospitals, at Sunnyside, Porirua, and Seacliff.

Seacliff was the single entry from Otago, and at an early stage there was discussion in regard to including the Dunedin side competing in the Wellington FA provincial rounds. This did not eventuate, and Seacliff were directly through to the South Island Final against Sunnyside.

There were four entries from North Auckland. Hikurangi, Waro Wanderers, Waro Corinthians and Y.M.C.A.(Whangarei).

The 1926 final
The final was played at the Basin Reserve, Wellington, a change of venue from the previous finals which had been at Newtown Park or Athletic Park. The following year the final briefly returned to Newtown Park, before making its permanent home at the Basin Reserve, a venue which was used regularly until the 1970s.

In the final, played in front of some 4000 spectators, Sunnyside's Archie Trotter became the first player to complete a Chatham Cup final hat-trick. The match was high scoring, but contemporary reports suggest that many opportunities were missed by both teams. H. Pickering put Sunnyside in front after just seven minutes. Archie Trotter doubled the lead for Sunnyside before L. Hipkins scored for North Shore. After the half-time interval Trotter scored two further goals before John Woolley scored a late consolation for North Shore.

Other notable features of the final included the appearance in the North Shore team of Reg Baxter, Dan Jones,  and Ces Dacre. Baxter and Jones were the first players to play for two different sides in Chatham Cup finals, having been part of the successful 1923 Seacliff and 1924 Auckland Harbour Board teams respectively. Dacre, while a fine player and New Zealand representative at football, is best remembered as one of New Zealand's foremost early cricketers.

Post-final at the weekly meeting of the Auckland Football Association in early September, the secretary, Mr. Dawson reported to the committee. The treatment by the New Zealand Council was praised, though the Wellington Football Association, in Dawson's opinion, had profiteered by insisting the payment of £20 over and above the rent due to the Wellington City Council for use of the Basin Reserve.

Results

First round

Second round

* Both results from Hikurangi v Y.M.C.A and Waro Corinthians v Waro Wanderers fixture's scheduled by the North Auckland Association for June 19 are yet to be found. A sudden down-turn in local employment, with 150 men idle by July 17 due in part to a flooded shaft at the Hikurangi coal mine, saw miners, many of whom were footballers, leave the area. Waro Wanderers played Hikurangi in the North Auckland District Final on July 17.

Third round

* Frankton Railways defaulted to Huntly. Huntly played v Huntly Thistle with 10 men. 

* Two players sent from field from each side.

Fourth round

Quarter-finals

Semi-finals

1926 Final
Teams

Sunnyside: Jim Callaghan, J. Simpson, H. Thompson, Archie Trotter, W. Robson, W. Bond, R. Purdie, H. Pickering, D. Sutherland, Bob McLachlan, Jim Wales

North Shore: Stewart Lipscombe, Len Colebourne, Peter Gerrard, Reg Baxter, Dick Bird, Dan Jones, L. Hipkins, Ces Dacre, George Jay, John Woolley, Jock Bradshaw.

References

Rec.Sport.Soccer Statistics Foundation New Zealand 1926 page

Chatham Cup
Chatham Cup
Chatham Cup